Rajpur is a village in Sonbhadra district in the Indian state of Uttar Pradesh. Its population in the 2011 census was 4,424.

References

Villages in Sonbhadra district